The Metropolitan Houseless Poor Act 1864 (27 & 28 Vict c. 116) was a short-term piece of legislation that imposed a legal obligation on Poor Law unions in London to provide temporary accommodation for "destitute wayfarers, wanderers, and foundlings". The Metropolitan Board of Works was given limited authority to reimburse the unions for the cost of building the necessary casual wards, an arrangement that was made permanent the following year by the passage of the Metropolitan Houseless Poor Act 1865 (28 & 29 Vict c. 34).

Most provincial Poor Law unions followed London's example, and by the 1870s, of the 643 then in existence, 572 had established casual wards for the reception of vagrants.

References

Citations

Bibliography

A Collection of the Public General Statutes passed in the Twenty-seventh and Twenty-eighth Years of the Reign of Her Majesty Queen Victoria. Printed by George Edward Eyre and William Sottiswoode, Printers to the Queen's most Excellent Majesty. London. 1864. Pages 574 to 575.

United Kingdom public law
United Kingdom Acts of Parliament 1864
Legal history of England
Housing legislation in the United Kingdom